Tambja affinis is a species of sea slug, a dorid nudibranch, a marine gastropod mollusk in the family Polyceridae.

Distribution
This species was originally described from a specimen found at Zanzibar, East Africa. It has been reported from various sites in the Indian Ocean, as far east as Ningaloo Reef, western Australia

Description
Tambja affinis has bright yellow stripes on a blue background.

References

Polyceridae
Gastropods described in 1904